The Torneo de Promoción y Reserva is a football tournament in Peru. There are currently 16 clubs in the league. Each team will have a roster of twelve 21-year-old players, three 19-year-olds, and three older reinforcements; whenever they be recorded in the club. The tournament will offer the champion two bonus points and the runner-up one bonus point to the respective regular teams in the 2018 Torneo Descentralizado.

Teams

Stadia and locations

Torneo de Verano

Group A

Group B

Torneo Descentralizado

Standings

See also
2018 Torneo Descentralizado

References

External links
  
Tournament regulations 
Tournament fixture 
Torneo de Promoción y Reserva  news at Peru.com 
Torneo de Promoción y Reserva news at Ovacion.pe 

Res
2018